Pintupi is an Australian Aboriginal language. It is one of the Wati languages of the large Pama–Nyungan family. It is one of the varieties of the Western Desert Language (WDL).

Pintupi is a variety of the Western Desert Language spoken by indigenous people whose traditional lands are in the area between Lake Macdonald and Lake Mackay, stretching from Mount Liebig in the Northern Territory to Jupiter Well (west of Pollock Hills) in Western Australia. These people moved (or were forced to move) into the indigenous communities of Papunya and Haasts Bluff in the west of the Northern Territory in the 1940s–1980s. The last Pintupi people to leave their traditional lifestyle in the desert came into Kiwirrkura in 1984. Over recent decades they have moved back into their traditional country, setting up the communities of Kintore (in Pintupi known as ) in the Northern Territory, Kiwirrkura and Jupiter Well (in Pintupi ) in Western Australia.

Children who were born in Papunya and Haasts Bluff grew up speaking a new variety of Pintupi, now known as Pintupi-Luritja, due to their close contact with speakers of Arrernte, Warlpiri and other varieties of the WDL. This has continued through the moves west so that most Pintupi people today speak Pintupi-Luritja, although there remains a clear distinction between the more western and eastern varieties.

Pintupi is one of the healthier Aboriginal languages and is taught to local children in schools.

Phonology 

The phonology of Pintupi has been described by K. C. and L. E. Hansen based on fieldwork conducted in Papunya, Northern Territory in 1967–1968.

Consonants
Pintupi has 17 consonant phonemes. The symbols used in the practical orthography are shown in brackets where they differ from the IPA symbols.

The lamino-alveolars are frequently palatalised, and  often has an affricated allophone .

The trill  usually has a single contact (i.e. a flap ) in ordinary speech, but multiple contacts (a true trill) in slow, emphatic, or angry speech. The retroflex approximant  may also be realised as a flap .

Hansen and Hansen (1969) refer to the retroflex consonants as "apico-domal".

Vowels 
Pintupi has six vowel phonemes, three long and three short. All are monophthongal at the phonemic level. Again, the symbols used in the practical orthography are shown enclosed in brackets where they differ from the phonemic symbols.

The short vowel phonemes are devoiced when word-final at the end of a clause, as in  'he finally (came) to camp',  'we all (brought) water for him', and  'it was close'.

Short vowels are rhotacised before retroflex consonants, as in  'tree (generic)',  'spear (one type)', and  'a shelter'.

Orthography

An orthography was developed by the Hansens and is used in their publications, which include a dictionary, a grammar sketch and bible portions. This orthography is also used in the bilingual school, and especially in the school's Literature Production Centre. The orthography is shown in the above tables of consonants and vowels.

Phonotactics 
Pintupi has only two possible syllable types: CV (a consonant followed by a vowel) and CVC (consonant-vowel-consonant). In the middle of a word,  and  may appear in the syllable coda only when followed by a homorganic plosive, as in  'left side' and  'mouse'. Otherwise, only coronal sonorants may appear in the syllable coda. All consonants except the apico-alveolars and  may appear in word-initial position; only coronal sonorants (except ) may appear in word-final position. However, at the end of a clause, the syllable  is added to consonant-final words, so consonants may not appear in clause-final position.

Short vowels may appear anywhere in the word; long vowels may appear only in the first syllable (which is stressed), as in  'eagle' and  'ignorant'.

Phonological processes 
When a suffix-initial  follows a root-final consonant, the  assimilates in place of articulation to the preceding consonant, as in  →  'younger sibling (transitive subject)',  →  'at the spirit ground'. However, the sequence  undergoes coalescence and surfaces as simple , as in  →  'at Tjintar'.

When two identical CV sequences meet at a word boundary, they undergo haplology and fuse into a single word in rapid speech, as in  →  'climbed into the car' and  →  'went around the middle'.

Prosody 
Pintupi words are stressed on the first syllable. In careful speech, every second syllable after that (i.e. the third, fifth, seventh, etc.) may receive a secondary stress, but secondary stress never falls on the final syllable of the word, as in  'for the benefit of Tjakamara' and  'because of mother-in-law'. However, the particle  (which indicates a change of subject) is not stressed when it is the first morpheme in a clause, as in  '(he) went'.

Works in the language

Universal Declaration of Human Rights
Pintupi-Luritja became the first Indigenous Australian language to receive a full, official translation of the Universal Declaration of Human Rights, when it was translated by elders and linguists at the Australian National University in 2015. Below is Article 1 in Pintupi-Luritja:

See also
Pintupi
Bindibu Expedition
List of Indigenous Australian group names

References

Bibliography

Wati languages
Pintupi
Indigenous Australian languages in Western Australia
Indigenous Australian languages in the Northern Territory
Vulnerable languages